Wynniatt Bay is an Arctic waterway and large inlet on the north side of Victoria Island, Canada, between the Richard Collinson Inlet and Hadley Bay. Most of the bay is in the Northwest Territories, but its eastern extremities (east of the 110th meridian west) are in the Kitikmeot Region of Nunavut.  The bay opens into Viscount Melville Sound to the north.

Victoria Island (Canada)
Bays of Kitikmeot Region
Bays of the Northwest Territories